"Belief" was the second single from John Mayer's 2006 album Continuum. The song features Ben Harper on guitar.

Despite its success on the American adult album alternative chart and the South African Top 40, the song never had a music video. The song was nominated for the Grammy Award for Best Male Pop Vocal Performance for the 50th Annual Grammy Awards.

Personnel
John Mayer – lead vocals, guitar
Ben Harper – guitar
Pino Palladino – bass
Clayton Cameron – drums
Manolo Badrena – percussion

Charts

References

John Mayer songs
2006 singles
Songs written by John Mayer
2006 songs